Kuopio is a Finnish city and municipality located in the region of Northern Savonia. Along with Joensuu, Kuopio is one of the major urban, economic, and cultural hubs of Eastern Finland. At the end of 2018, its urban area had a population of 89,307.

Though the city's population is spread out , the city's urban areas are populated comparably densely (urban area: 1,618 /km²), making Kuopio Finland's second-most densely populated city.

Kuopio is known nationwide as one of the most important study cities and centers of attraction and growth.  The city's history has been characterized by several municipality mergers since 1969, as a result of which Kuopio now includes much countryside; Kuopio's population surpassed 100,000 when the town of Nilsiä joined the city at the beginning of 2013. When Maaninka joined Kuopio at the beginning of 2015, Kuopio became Finland's largest milk producing community and Finland's second largest beef producing community. In addition, at the end of the 2010s, Kuopio was noted for numerous large projects, which are the largest nationwide after the Helsinki's metropolitan area. With the large tourist center in Tahkovuori, Kuopio has also grown into a major tourist city. Kuopio Airport, located in the Siilinjärvi municipality, is Finland's fifth-busiest airport, with over 235,000 passengers in 2017.

According to Kuntarating 2017 survey, Kuopio has the most satisfied residents among the 20 largest cities, and according to the 2018 survey, Kuopio is the best city for real estate investors. In the Kuntien imago 2018 survey, Kuopio ranks second among large cities of Finland after Seinäjoki of South Ostrobothnia. In T-media'''s attraction and influence of the ten biggest cities study in 2021 and 2022, Kuopio is the second most attractive city in Finland, with Tampere holding the first place.Kuopio on Suomen toiseksi vetovoimaisin kaupunki – YLE, 8 April 2022. (in Finnish)

Kuopio was the European Region of Gastronomy in 2020. It is also known as home of Kalakukko, a traditional food of Savonia, which is why Kuopio is also known by the nickname the "Promised Land of Kalakukko".

 Etymology 
Several explanations are behind the name Kuopio. The first is that in the 16th century, a certain influential person named Kauhanen in Tavinsalmi changed his name to Skopa and the people's pronunciation was Coopia and finally Cuopio. The second explanation is that it comes from the verb kuopia, meaning "paw", as when a horse paws the ground with its hoof. A third explanation is that it came from a certain Karelian man's name Prokopij, from Ruokolahti in the Middle Ages. This explanation is the most likely, and is supported by the Research Institute for the Languages of Finland.

 Heraldry 

The coat of arms of Kuopio was designed in 1823 based on a drawing by the town councilor Karl Hårdh or possibly his artist son, Adolf Hårdh. The coat of arms was approved for use in 1823 by the Kuopio Magistrate in accordance with the order of Alexander I of Russia. The coat of arms building, which represents Kuopio Cathedral, has often been mistakenly considered to be Kuopio City Hall, completed in 1886.

The current design of the coat of arms is the work of architect Seppo Ruotsalainen. The coat of arms in its current form was approved at a meeting of Kuopio City Council on 25 November 1957, and the Ministry of the Interior confirmed the coat of arms and its explanation on 12 June 1958.

 History 

In the 1550s, under the influence of Mikael Agricola, a church and a parish were founded in Kuopionniemi. Governor Peter Brahe founded the city of Kuopio in 1653, but the official date is recognized as 17 November 1775, when King Gustav III of Sweden ordered the formal establishment of the city.

The period of Russian rule (1809–1917) brought notable transportation development within Eastern Finland. The Saimaa Canal (1856) opened up a summer route towards the Baltic Sea, and the Savonia railway (1889) improved transport in winter.

After World War II, the city's population grew significantly, due in part to the settlement of Karelian evacuees and the high birth rate. The rapid growth of the population forced the expansion of schools; at the end of the 1940s, support was also provided for school transports and the provision of free school meals (the poor people had received it in Kuopio since 1902). The large number of young people and the lack of activities for youths also gave rise to outbreaks of violence in the city, such as the Kuopio Market Riot in September 1965 which was a spontaneous event instigated by two young men; 30 young people were fined for rioting. In the 1960s, the first construction of the actual suburb, Puijonlaakso, began. Since then, the new areas have each grown in turn: in the 1960s, Puijonlaakso and Tiihotar (as part of Saarijärvi); In the 1970s Saarijärvi, Kelloniemi and Levänen; In the 1980s, Jynkkä and Neulamäki.

The municipality of Maaninka joined the city of Kuopio in 2015, the town of Nilsiä in 2013, and Karttula in 2011, as did Vehmersalmi in 2005, Riistavesi in 1973, and Kuopion maalaiskunta in 1969.

 Geography 

The city is surrounded by Lake Kallavesi, and several parts of it are built on islands. With an area of  Lake Kallavesi is the tenth largest lake in Finland. In the wake of the Yoldia Sea, which followed the Weichselian glaciation and preceded the Baltic Sea, there are ancient beaches up to 140 m above the current sea level, of which the current Lake Kallavesi is 82 m above sea level. Kuopio's ample waterfronts and islands are also used in the Saaristokaupunki (lit. Archipelago city) -project, the biggest residential area currently being built in Finland. Saaristokaupunki will accommodate a total of 14,000 inhabitants in 2015.

Kuopio Market Square is the undisputed center of the city and the city center follows a densely built grid pattern with several parks and narrow gutter streets. The environment of the city is quite distinctive; the surface shapes of the waterfront-lined center are so variable that a flat property is a desired rarity. The settlement has spread outside the center of Kuopio according to a dense and sparse finger model that is affordable for public transport, and the new districts have been built in a municipal drive at once; for example, the Saaristokaupunki was banned for building for the previous 25 years, and this Kuopio zoning tradition has a long history. Due to the above-mentioned factors, the population density of the Kuopio city center is the highest in Finland.

With the surrounding lakes, the shoreline in Kuopio is 4,760 kilometers. The terrain is also characterized by rich forests, and the clear center of the Kuopio's lund forest is mainly located in the area between Kuopio, Nilsiä and Siilinjärvi. Of the Finnish municipalities, Kuopio has the second largest number of summer cottages and holiday homes. In 2013, the number of summer cottages was 8,684. The number of summer homes in Kuopio has increased in recent years due to municipal associations. Due to the abundance of water bodies, Kuopio also has a remarkably favorable climate compared to the latitude. The annual sum of the effective temperature is about as high in Kuopio as in places further south than, for example, Tampere and Lahti.

 Subdivisions 

There are more than 50 districts and villages in Kuopio.

 Väinölänniemi
 Vahtivuori
 Maljalahti
 Multimäki
 Kuopionlahti
 Hatsala
 Niirala
 Haapaniemi
 Itkonniemi
 Männistö
 Linnanpelto
 Saarijärvi
 Puijonlaakso
 Savilahti
 Peipposenrinne
 Inkilänmäki
 Särkiniemi
 Kettulanlahti
 Rahusenkangas
 Rönö
 Rypysuo
 Päiväranta
 Julkula
 Sorsasalo
 Kelloniemi
 Levänen
 Jynkkä
 Neulamäki
 Puijo
 Niuva
 Neulaniemi
 Kolmisoppi
 Neulalampi
 Petonen
 Litmanen
 Pirtti
 Pitkälahti
 Saaristokaupunki
 Lehtoniemi
 Rautaniemi
 Hiltulanlahti
 Kiviharju
 Vanuvuori
 Melalahti
 Kurkimäki
 Vehmersalmi
 Karttula
 Nilsiä
 Tahko
 Maaninka
 Keskisaari
 Juankoski
 Säyneinen
 Puutossalmi
 Pellesmäki

 Climate 
Kuopio falls in the subarctic climate zone (Köppen "Dfc"), closely bordering on continental due to its warm summers. Winters are long and cold, with average highs staying below freezing from November until March, and summers are short and relatively mild.  Most precipitation occurs in the late summer and early fall. The summers are relatively warm for its latitude, especially the lows. This is due to influence from the lake, making it much warmer on summer nights than in areas away from water. In winter, maritime moderation is eliminated as the lake freezes over.

 Demographics 

Kuopio is the eighth largest city in Finland in terms of its population. At the beginning of 2021, the population was 120,246, compared to only about 10,000 at the beginning of the 20th century. There are around 5,200 foreign citizens (31 December 2020). The average age of Kuopio residents is 40,6 years (2014).

 Religion 

The largest church denomination in Finland, Evangelical Lutheran Church has a diocese in Kuopio, which is shepherded by bishop Jari Jolkkonen. One of the most significant Lutheran churches in the city is the Kuopio Cathedral, completed in 1816.

Kuopio is home of the Finnish Orthodox Church where its primate, archbishop of Karelia and all Finland Leo (Makkonen) is seated. This is an autonomous jurisdiction affiliated with the Patriarchate of Constantinople. It is the only mainstream Orthodox faction to celebrate Easter on the Latin date. The late Archbishop Paul had been successful in producing literature of popular theology. The city is also the location of RIISA- Orthodox Church Museum of Finland.

Kuopio also has an Islamic mosque. Muslims from various parts of the world and certain Finnish Muslims live in Kuopio.

The town is also home to the first Burmese Buddhist monastery in Finland, named the Buddha Dhamma Ramsi Monastery.

 Economy 

Kuopio's economic structure is very diverse. In 2008, there were about 4,200 enterprises in Kuopio, of which approximately 180 were export companies. These provided about 45,000 jobs. In 2016, this grew to a total of about 5,050 companies, of which more than 190 also trade abroad. There are a total of 50,877 jobs. The business service of the City of Kuopio plays a significant role in the development of Kuopio's business life. The business service promotes the development of companies operating in Kuopio and improves the operating environments of companies. The most important thing in developing operating environments is to improve the supply of estate and business premises. The Kuopio University Hospital (KUH) is Kuopio's second largest employer after the City of Kuopio; in 2011, KUH employed a total of 4,113 people.

Tourism is of great importance to Kuopio's business life; the Rauhalahti camping site is one indication of Kuopio's expertise, as it is the only five-star camping site in Finland. The city has also a comprehensive hotel offer for tourism, one of the most notable is Hotel Savonia, part of the Best Western hotel chain, in the Puijonlaakso district. Arranging accommodation and program services gives many jobs. Kuopio's Entrepreneurs (Kuopion Yrittäjät), the local association of Savonia Entrepreneurs (Savon Yrittäjät), operates in Kuopio.

The most significant recent business projects are the centralization of Honeywell's Finnish operations in Kuopio, the completion of Ark Therapeutics' gene medicine plant, the marine industry concentration built by Bella Boats at the Marine Park in Haapaniemi's Siikaniemi and the construction of Junttan's EUR 15 million assembly plant at Kylmämäki at the end of 2008. The site of Junttan's current factory in Särkilahti will have space for a large shopping center. The 9.7-hectare plot purchased by Savocon and TKD Finland for EUR 11 million has a building right for 58,500 square meters. The two companies plan to invest a total of about 40 million euros in the project. A significant industrial player is also Savon Sello company in Sorsasalo, which is currently owned by Powerflute Oyj. One of the biggest projects and investments of recent years is the preparation of the construction of Finnpulp's largest and most modern softwood pulp mill in Kuopio. The most significant retail investments are the Prisma hypermarket completed in December 2007 and the Päiväranta's K-Citymarket completed in August 2008. A hardware store Kodin Terra was opened in Pitkälahti, as well as the Ikano Group's Matkus Shopping Center in the Hiltulanlahti area in November 2012 and an IKEA department store in May 2013.

 Culture 

Kuopio is known as the cultural center of Eastern Finland. One of Kuopio's most important cultural venues are the Kuopio Museum, the Kuopio Art Museum and the Kuopio City Theatre in the city center. A wide range of musical (from kindergarten to doctorate-level studies) and dance education is available and the cultural life is active. Notable events include ANTI – Contemporary Art Festival, Kuopio Dance Festival, Kuopio Rockcock, Kuopio Wine Festival, Kuopio Marathon and Finland Ice Marathon in winter. A notable place, however, to enjoy the local flavor of Kuopio life and food is Sampo, a fish restaurant loved by locals and tourists as well.

Kuopio is known for its association with a national delicacy, Finnish fish pastry (Kalakukko), and the dialect of Savo, as well as the hill of Puijo and the Puijo tower. Besides being a very popular outdoor recreation area, Puijo serves also as a stage for a yearly World Cup ski jumping competition.

In inhabitants of Kuopio have a special reputation: they are known as jovial and verbally joking. Within the Savo culture, the onus is placed on the listener to interpret the story.  Niuvanniemi a historical psychiatric hospital is also located in the western part of the city in the Niuva district.

During the 2000s, Kuopio has placed very well in a number of image, popularity and city-attractiveness surveys. In 2007 it was placed third, behind Tampere and Oulu.

 Sports 

Kuopio bid for the 2012 Winter Youth Olympics, a youth sports festival in the tradition of the Olympics.  It became a finalist in November 2008, but ultimately lost to Innsbruck, Austria.  Kuopio's image as a small city with a large University and many active young people was considered a model of what the International Olympic Committee seeks for the Games.

KalPa (ice hockey)
KuPS (football)
Kuopion Taitoluistelijat (figure skating)
Puijon Hiihtoseura (skiing, ski jumping, nordic combined, biathlon)
Puijon Pesis (pesäpallo)
Kuopion Reippaan voimistelijat (gymnastics)
Finland Ice Marathon (ice skating event)
Kuopio Steelers (american football)
Kuopio Skating club, Kuopion Luisteluseura KuLs (figure skating)
Welhot (floorball)
Linkki (basketball)

 Transport 

The city has a nationally unique feature in its street network, where every other street is reserved for pedestrian and cycle traffic, so-called "rännikatu" (derived from the Swedish gränd'', alley). These streets provide pedestrians a calm environment away from vehicular traffic. This setup dates back to Kuopio's first town plan by Pehr Kjellman in 1776. Originally, rännikadut were created as a fire barrier to prevent a possible fire escalating in a mainly wood-constructed city.

Two Finnish highways cross Kuopio: Finnish national road 5 (Vt 5; part of E63 in the northern side of city), which extends south to Helsinki and north to Sodankylä, and Finnish national road 9 (Vt 9; part of E63 in the western side of city), which extends west to Turku and east to the Niirala checkpoint on the Finnish-Russian border. The Blue Highway passes through Kuopio. It is an international tourist route from Mo i Rana, Norway to Pudozh, Russia via Sweden and Finland.

Long-distance transport connections from Kuopio include Pendolino and InterCity trains from Kuopio railway station to several destinations around Finland, operated by VR, as well as multiple daily departures from Kuopio Airport on Finnair to Helsinki. The passenger harbour of the port of Kuopio, located on the shore of Lake Kallavesi, is the busiest port for passenger traffic in the Vuoksi drainage basin and the Finnish Lakeland.

Education 

Kuopio has always been a city of education. Some of the first schools offering education in Finnish (such as the School for the Blind in 1871, and the Trade School in 1887) were established in Kuopio. Currently the most important institutions are the University of Eastern Finland, the Savonia University of Applied Sciences, Vocational College of Northern Savonia and the Kuopio department of the Sibelius Academy. One of the oldest schools in the city is Kuopio Lyceum High School, which was officially established in 1872, but was originally built in 1826 and designed by Carl Ludvig Engel.

Kuopio is known as a strong center of health (e.g. it has the biggest yearly enrollment rate of medical students in Finland), pharmacy, environment, food & nutrition (all legalized Clinical and Public Health Nutritionists in Finland graduate from the University of Eastern Finland), safety (education in Emergency Services is centered in Kuopio) and welfare professions, as the major organisations University of Kuopio (now part of the University of Eastern Finland since January 2010.), Savonia University of Applied Sciences and Technopolis Kuopio are particularly oriented to those areas.

Notable people

International relations

Kuopio is twinned with 15 cities around the world. It also has one twin county, Lääne-Viru County, Estonia.

Twin towns – Sister cities

Kuopio is twinned with:

See also
 Finnish national road 5
 Kauppakatu
 Kuopio Battalion
 Kuopio Football Club
 The Kuopio Province
 The Kuopio school stabbing
 Kuopio Senior High of Music and Dance
 Nilsiä
 The Puijo Hill
 Siilinjärvi
 University of Eastern Finland

References

External links

 Kuopio – Official website 
 City of Kuopio – Another official website 
 KuopioInfo – Various resources about different areas of interest related to Kuopio History and Life 
 360° panorama of Kuopio Marketplace
 Savonia University of Applied Sciences 
 University of Eastern Finland 
 KPY Novapolis Kuopio 
 Invest in Kuopio -factsheet 
 Kuopio Mosque
 Satellite picture by Google Maps

 
Cities and towns in Finland
Inland port cities and towns in Finland
Grand Duchy of Finland
Populated places established in 1653
Populated lakeshore places in Finland